Bilharzial cor pulmonale is the condition of right sided heart failure secondary to fibrosis and sclerosis of the pulmonary artery branches. It results from shifting of the Schistosoma haematobium ova from the pelvic and vesical plexus to the pulmonary artery branches where they settle and produce granuloma and fibrosis.

Bilharzial cor pulmonale occurs in Schistosoma mansoni, when the portal pressure rises more than the systemic pressure. So blood will pass from the portal circulation to the systemic circulation carrying Schistosoma mansoni ova to reach the lungs.

This condition leads to pulmonary hypertension, right ventricular hypertrophy and failure.

See also
 Cor pulmonale.

References

Pulmonary heart disease and diseases of pulmonary circulation
Cardiomegaly